Lu Shengkui (1822–1889) was a Qing dynasty Peking opera artist and dramatist based in Beijing who specialized in laosheng roles, or old gentlemen. Unlike most performers, he was from a literate family of officials and received a good early education. He only joined the theatre troupe after failing the imperial examination. In addition to performing, he wrote several plays for the Three Celebrations Company (三慶班), based on older story cycles.

In popular culture
Peking opera actor Zhao Chungang (赵纯钢) played Lu Shengkui in the 1994 TV series Big Boss Cheng Changgeng (大老板程長庚).

References

Chinese male Peking opera actors
19th-century Chinese male actors
19th-century Chinese male singers
1822 births
1889 deaths
19th-century Chinese dramatists and playwrights